7220 is the seventh studio album by American rapper Lil Durk. It was released through Only the Family, Alamo Records, and Sony Music on March 11, 2022. The album features guest appearances from Future, Gunna, Summer Walker, and Morgan Wallen. The reloaded edition was released on March 18, 2022, exactly one week after its release. The deluxe edition of the album was released on June 24, 2022 and features additional appearances from Moneybagg Yo, EST Gee, Doodie Lo, Ella Mai and A Boogie wit da Hoodie.

7220 received generally positive reviews from music critics. It debuted at number one on the US Billboard 200 chart, earning 120,500 album-equivalent units in its first week.

Background
7220 refers to Durk's grandmother's address and is also the title of a book that was published by his mother, Lashawnda Woodard, the same year of its release. When he revealed the tracklist of the album, he further explained that it was also a reference to his family house that he grew up in that "made [him] the realist ", on which he promised that the album would have "no skips", a phrase meaning that none of the tracks on the album could be considered of such a low quality that they should be skipped while listening through the album, track-by-track.

Release and promotion
On November 4, 2021, Durk revealed the title of the album through an Instagram story. On January 12, 2022, he announced that he will go on tour for 7220, with the first show on April 8, 2022, in Phoenix, Arizona, and the last show on May 2, 2022, in his hometown of Chicago, Illinois. On January 31, 2022, he revealed that the title of the album refers to his grandmother's address and revealed that it was completed. Exactly a week later, on February 7, 2022, he announced its release date, and that it would coincide with the release of fellow Chicago rapper and previous collaborator Kanye West's eleventh studio album, Donda 2; however, both albums did not drop on the expected date and were delayed.

Singles
The lead single of the album, "Pissed Me Off", was released on October 15, 2021. The second single, "Broadway Girls", which features American country music singer Morgan Wallen, was released on December 17, 2021. The third single, "AHHH HA", was released on February 22, 2022, the day that the album was originally supposed to be released. The fourth single, "Golden Child", was released on March 10, 2022, only one day before the album. The fifth single, "Computer Murderers", was added to the album as the only new track for its reloaded edition on March 18, 2022. The sixth, final, and first single from the deluxe edition, "Did Shit to Me" featuring American rapper Doodie Lo was released June 22, 2022, two days ahead of the deluxe edition's release.

Critical reception

7220 received generally positive reviews by music critics. Tivo Staff from AllMusic stated that "while the repetitive production moves can make the beats feel somewhat interchangeable, Durk's hyperpersonalized stories of loss, betrayal, grief, and street struggles usually rise above the album's occasionally monotonous sound". Writing for Clash, Robin Murray described  7220 as "a vastly potent work, one that is unafraid to stare down ugly truths; half-in-love with the world around him, he moves from the elixir of criminality to some of his most profound observations on the art" and felt that the album "pivots between major league production and harsh introversion, with its relentlessly visceral rhymes documenting loss, addiction, and violence – against others, and against the self" and "invites the listener into Lil Durk's world, a realm framed by the spectre of death, chemical abuse, and a suffocating lack of material exits". Alphonse Pierre of Pitchfork addressed Durk melodically rapping about his childhood struggles over piano-heavy production, stating that "there are a lot of singing rappers in a similar lane, but Durk stands out because of his bruised wailing and lyrics so specific that they have to be based on some truth" and "even with the stale sound of the album, Durk is such a complex and colorful writer that it's worth it to stick it out", adding that "Lil Durk has become a huge star because of lyrics that focus in, instead of zoom out", so "for the most part, 7220 gets that". Rolling Stone music critic Will Dukes put the album as "a chill trip down memory lane, full of soothing meditations on how he made it out the mud" and "the Englewood [, Chicago] native intends for this project—named after his grandmother's address—to be a poignant snapshot of his fast life and times", adding that "most of these 17 songs are vivid retellings of what happens on the front lines"

Writing for Vulture, Craig Jenkins felt that the album "ponders the emotional fallout of a year of big achievements and crushing lows" and referred to themes of gang culture and street violence, stating; "a more eloquent rapper and a more capable vocalist now, Durk uses 7220 to show how persistent and deep-rooted these problems are", also praising Durk's rap-singing over the smooth production throughout most of the album. Vibe music critic Preezy Brown opined that "finds Durk giving autobiographical accounts that bring listeners into his world and provide a glimpse into the makings of the man behind the music", adding that "while it's still a bit early for grand proclamations, as it stands, 7220 is an admirable effort from Lil Durk and is definitely in the running for being his most well-rounded and cohesive solo effort to date".

Commercial performance
7220 debuted at number one on the US Billboard 200 chart, earning 120,500 album-equivalent units (including 2,500 copies in pure album sales) in its first week. This became Durk's second US number one debut on the chart, following his collaborative album with fellow American rapper Lil Baby, The Voice of the Heroes (2021), and became his first chart-topping solo album. The album also accumulated a total of 164.81 million on-demand streams of the album's songs.

Track listing

Notes
  Signifies an uncredited co-producer

Charts

Weekly charts

Year-end charts

Certifications

References

 

 

2022 albums
Albums produced by Cubeatz
Albums produced by Hitmaka
Albums produced by Southside (record producer)
Albums produced by TM88
Lil Durk albums
Sony Music albums